Jorge Camiña (born 21 July 1947) is a Spanish field hockey player. He competed in the men's tournament at the 1972 Summer Olympics.

References

External links
 

1947 births
Living people
Spanish male field hockey players
Olympic field hockey players of Spain
Field hockey players at the 1972 Summer Olympics
Place of birth missing (living people)